Eric Turner may refer to:
 Eric Turner (American football) (1968–2000), American football player
 Eric Turner (singer) (born 1977), American singer and songwriter
 Eric Gardner Turner (1911–1983), English papyrologist and classicist
 Eric Turner (basketball) (born 1963), American basketball player
 Eric Turner (athlete) (born 1909), English athlete
 P. Eric Turner (born 1951), Indiana politician

See also
 Erik Turner (born 1964), musician from Omaha, Nebraska